Kuo Cheng-wei (born 9 November 1983) is a Taiwanese professional archer representing Chinese Taipei. He competed in Archery at the 2006 Asian Games and won a silver medal with the men's team consisting of himself, Chen Szu-yuan, Hsu Tzu-yi and Wang Cheng-pang

2008 Summer Olympics
At the 2008 Summer Olympics in Beijing Kuo finished his ranking round with a total of 659 points. This gave him the 29th seed for the final competition bracket in which he faced Mark Javier in the first round, beating the Philippine 106–102. In the second round Kuo was eliminated by Park Kyung-Mo with just one point (111-110). Park would eventually win the silver medal.

Together with Chen Szu-Yuan and Wang Cheng-Pang he also took part in the team event. With his 659 score from the ranking round combined with the 654 of Chen and the 667 of Wang they were in seventh position after the ranking round. In the first round they were too strong for the American team 222–218, but in the quarter final they were unable to beat the Ukrainian team 214–211.

References

External links
 
 
 
 

1983 births
Living people
Archers at the 2008 Summer Olympics
Archers at the 2012 Summer Olympics
Asian Games medalists in archery
Olympic archers of Taiwan
Place of birth missing (living people)
Archers at the 2006 Asian Games
Archers at the 2010 Asian Games
Archers at the 2014 Asian Games
Taiwanese male archers
World Archery Championships medalists
Asian Games silver medalists for Chinese Taipei
Asian Games bronze medalists for Chinese Taipei
Medalists at the 2006 Asian Games
Medalists at the 2014 Asian Games
Universiade medalists in archery
Universiade gold medalists for Chinese Taipei
Universiade silver medalists for Chinese Taipei
Medalists at the 2005 Summer Universiade